Botta is a surname. People with this surname can be found in Brazil and in the southern Indian state of Andhra Pradesh. Notable people with the surname include:

 Antoniotto Botta Adorno (1688-1774), Italian-born diplomat in the service of Austria
Alejandro Meloño Botta (born 1977), football player from Uruguay 
Anne C. Lynch Botta (1815–1891), American poet and teacher
Bergonzio Botta (c.1454–1504), Italian politician who played a formative role in ballet
Carlo Giuseppe Guglielmo Botta (1766–1837), Italian historian
Dan Botta (1907–1958), Romanian poet, essayist, and far right activist
Emil Botta (1911–1977), Romanian poet, essayist and actor
Luca Botta (1882–1917), Italian opera singer
Mario Botta (born 1943), Swiss architect
Miguel Ángel Botta (born 1940), Argentine boxer
Rubén Botta (born 1990), Argentinian footballer
Paul-Émile Botta or Paolo Emiliano Botta (1802–1870), Italian-French archaeologist and naturalist
Renee Botta, Chair of the Department of Media, Film & Journalism Studies at the University of Denver 
Santiago García Botta (born 1992), Argentine rugby union player
Stefano Botta (born 1986), Italian football midfielder
Vincenzo Botta (1818-1894), Italian-born politician and professor of philosophy

See also
Botta, a fictional character in the video game Tales of Symphonia
Bottas
BOTA (disambiguation)